John Glenn Columbus International Airport  is an international airport located  east of downtown Columbus, Ohio. Formerly known as  Port Columbus International Airport, it is managed by the Columbus Regional Airport Authority, which also oversees operations at Rickenbacker International Airport and Bolton Field. The airport code "CMH" stands for "Columbus Municipal Hangar," the original name of the airport.

John Glenn Columbus International Airport is primarily a passenger airport. It provides 148 non-stop flights to 31 airports via nine airlines daily.

On May 25, 2016, the Ohio General Assembly passed a bill to rename the airport from Port Columbus International Airport to its current name, in honor of astronaut and four-term U.S. senator John Glenn. The name change was unanimously approved by the airport's nine-member board on May 24, 2016. Ohio Governor John Kasich signed the bill into law on June 14, 2016, with the name change becoming official 90 days later. On June 28, 2016, a celebration of the renaming was held and new signage bearing the airport's new name was unveiled.

History

Early history

The airport opened July 8, 1929 as the Port Columbus Airport on a site selected by Charles Lindbergh, as the eastern air terminus of the Transcontinental Air Transport air-rail New York to Los Angeles transcontinental route. Passengers traveled overnight on the Pennsylvania Railroad's Airway Limited from New York to Columbus; by air from Columbus to Waynoka, Oklahoma; by rail again on the Atchison, Topeka & Santa Fe from Waynoka to Clovis, New Mexico; and by air from Clovis to Los Angeles. The original terminal building and hangars remain; the hangars are still in use, but the old terminal sits derelict.

During World War II, most of the facility was taken over by the U.S. Navy, which established Naval Air Station Columbus in 1942. NAS Columbus was closed and the facility relinquished back to civilian authorities in 1946. Also, during the war, the government established a government-owned aviation factory on the grounds of the airport known as Air Force Factory 85, eventually operated by North American Aviation. The plant produced the F-100 Super Saber, RA-5 Vigilante, T-2 Buckeye, T-28 Trojan, OV-10 Bronco and T-39 Sabreliner.

The diagram on the February 1951 Coast & Geodetic Survey instrument-approach chart shows runways 006/186 3550 ft long, 052/232 4400 ft, 096/276 4500 ft, and 127/307 5030 ft.

A new $12 million terminal building opened on September 21, 1958. Jet airline flights (American 707s) started in April 1964.

Historical airline service
The April 1957 Official Airline Guide shows 72 airline departures each weekday: 41 TWA, 16 American, 6 Eastern, 6 Lake Central and 3 Piedmont.

The first major airline to fly into Columbus was TWA, and it kept a presence at Columbus over 70 years during the era of airline regulation. TWA offered a club for exclusive passengers up until 2000 when America West took over a gate held by TWA and the club itself due to financial problems. The site of the club is now Eddie George‘s 27 grille. 

Columbus was formerly a hub of America West Airlines in the 1990s, but the company closed the hub in 2003 due to financial losses and the post 9/11-decline in air travel.

The airport was the home base of short-lived Skybus Airlines, which began operations from Columbus on May 22, 2007. The airline touted themselves as the cheapest airline in the United States, offering a minimum of ten seats for $10 each on every flight. Skybus ceased operations April 4, 2008.

Recent improvements

A $70 million renovation of airport facilities, designed by Brubaker/Brandt, was initiated in 1979 for the airport's 50th anniversary and completed in 1981. This upgraded the airport's capacity to 250 flights per day by adding what is known today as Concourse B and added fully enclosed jetways at every gate. Ten years later in 1989, a second, $15.5 million, seven-gate south concourse (now Concourse A) was dedicated. The concourse was used exclusively by US Airways at the time, and later housed hubs for both America West Airlines until 2003, and Skybus Airlines until they shut it down in 2008 due to their bankruptcy. A north concourse was completed in 1996, which is now Concourse C, and was expanded in 2002.

Between 1998 and 2000, numerous airport expansion and renovation projects were completed, including a $25 million terminal renovation in 1998 that included additional retail shops, new flight information displays, enhanced lighting, upgraded flooring, and a new food court. Also, new hangars and office spaces were completed for NetJets in 1999, as well as a $92 million parking garage including an underground terminal entrance, new rental car facilities, dedicated ground transportation area, improved eight-lane terminal access on two levels, and a new atrium and entrances in 2000, which were designed by URS Corporation.

On April 25, 2004, a new  control tower directed its first aircraft. This began several major facility enhancements to be constructed through 2025. On October 21, 2010, a new arrivals/departures board replaced the old one in the main entrance area

Columbus began its Terminal Modernization Program in late 2012, which included new terrazzo flooring throughout the airport, new ceilings, new restrooms, more TSA security lanes, and new LED lighting. Construction started on Concourse A in late 2012 and was completed throughout the terminal in early 2016.

In 2013, the airport completed a $140 million runway improvement that moved the south runway farther from the north runway. This created a buffer distance that enables simultaneous takeoffs and landings on the north and south runways, increasing air traffic volume. Columbus mayor Michael B. Coleman commented, "As the city grows, the airport needs to grow with it."

In 2019, construction began on a new car rental facility at the airport, with an estimated budget of $140 million. This facility moves car rental out of the parking garage, opening up more spaces for travelers. The new building opened in late 2021, and utilizes electric buses to transport passengers.

Recent history
Many airlines introduced new routes in the late 2010s, with the addition of Alaska Airlines with one daily flight to Seattle. Occasionally, larger aircraft that the airport is not used to receiving on a regular basis, such as the Boeing 767 and 777, are chartered through John Glenn and serviced by Lane Aviation.

Due to the COVID-19 pandemic, many new, current, and to-be-expanded routes were canceled or reduced. Air Canada temporarily suspended service to Columbus, while airlines such as United, American, and Delta used smaller aircraft for some of their mainline routes. Many of these routes saw an increase of service in mid-2021 as restrictions lifted and demand for air travel grew. Startup Breeze Airways also selected Columbus as one of its launch destinations in July with five routes.

Plans have been in development for many years for a new terminal, set to begin construction in 2024 to replace the current, aging building, beginning with the new car rental facility completed in 2021. As such, these plans involve a complete relocation of major on-site facilities, such as Lane Aviation's entire complex, in order to accommodate the project. The new terminal is suggested to house roughly 40 gates, 6 more than the current terminal capacity (2 of which intended for international arrivals), and would be one interconnected structure rather than three separate concourses inaccessible to each other past security.

Facilities

Terminal
John Glenn Columbus International Airport has one terminal with three concourses, and a total of 34 gates. Non-precleared international flights are processed in Concourse C, which contains the airports customs facility.

Concourse A contains 7 gates, and is used primarily by Southwest Airlines.
Concourse B contains 16 gates, and is used primarily by American Airlines, Air Canada, Spirit Airlines, and United Airlines.
Concourse C contains 11 gates, and is used primarily by Alaska Airlines, Breeze Airways, Delta Air Lines, and Frontier Airlines.

Ground transportation
The airport is accessible directly by taking exit number nine on Interstate 670 to International Gateway. Alternatively, drivers can also get to the airport from the east via Hamilton Road, just south of Interstate 270, and enter at Sawyer Road or from the west via Stelzer Road.

Connected to the terminal is a six-story parking garage that provides long-term and short-term parking. Lower cost satellite parking options, with continuous free shuttle service, can be found in the Blue, Red and Green parking lots along International Gateway. The Blue lot is the closest to the terminal and also offers some covered parking. The cost of parking a car in the blue lot is $9 per 24 hours. The Red Lot costs $7 per 24 hours and the green lost costs $5 per 24 hours to park. The Green lot is the furthest away from the terminal. Additionally, there is a free cell phone lot accessed from the outbound side of International Gateway.

The Columbus Metropolitan Area's bus service, the Central Ohio Transit Authority (COTA), has two bus services between the airport and downtown Columbus. AirConnect, a service that began in 2016, stops at the arrival and departure levels every 30 minutes. COTA's 7 Mt. Vernon route is operated from downtown, with every other bus serving either the airport or Easton Transit Center.

The GoBus Rural Inter-City Bus Service operates a thrice daily schedule to Athens, via Lancaster, Logan, and Nelsonville.

Inbound taxi services operate through numerous taxi businesses in the Columbus area. A number of taxi services provide outbound transportation in the taxi lane.

Other facilities
In 2001, Executive Jet Aviation (now known as NetJets), opened up a  operational headquarters.

In November 2006, Skybus Airlines began leasing  of office and hangar facilities at the Columbus International AirCenter adjacent to the airport.

Regional carrier Republic Airways operates a large crew and maintenance base at the airport.

The airport has its own police and fire departments (ARFF-C).

Airlines and destinations

Statistics

Top destinations

Airline market share

Airport traffic

Annual passenger traffic

Accidents and incidents
 On June 27, 1954, an American Airlines Convair CV-240 (N94263) from Dayton International Airport was on approach to Runway 27 at  when the left side of the plane collided with a US Navy Beechcraft SNB-2C Navigator (BuA23773), also on approach. The Convair recovered and landed, though the nose gear collapsed on landing. The Beechcraft crashed short of the runway, killing two on board. The probable cause was attributed to a "traffic control situation created by the tower local controller which he allowed to continue without taking the necessary corrective action. A contributing factor was the failure of both crews to detect this situation by visual and/or aural vigilance."
The aircraft collided with a stand of trees and came to rest inside a commercial building  short of the runway and burst into flames. The accident killed all three crewmembers and two of five passengers. The probable cause was attributed to "(1) An aerodynamic stall that occurred when the flight crew allowed the airspeed to decay to stall speed following a very poorly planned and executed approach characterized by an absence of procedural discipline; (2) Improper pilot response to the stall warning, including failure to advance the power levers to maximum, and inappropriately raising the flaps; (3) Flight crew experience in 'glass cockpit' automated aircraft, aircraft type and in seat position, a situation exacerbated by a side letter of agreement between the company and its pilots; and (4) the company's failure to provide adequate stabilized approach criteria, and the FAA's failure to require such criteria. Member Vogt concluded that the last factor was contributory but not causal to the accident. Additionally, for the following two factors, Chairman Hall and Member Lauber concluded that they were causal to the accident, while Members Vogt and Hammerschmidt concluded they were contributory to the accident: (5) The company's failure to provide adequate crew resource management training, and the FAA's failure to require such training; and (6) the unavailability of suitable training simulators that precluded fully effective flight crew training."

See also

 Brushstrokes in Flight

References

External links

National Air Traffic Controllers Association (NATCA) CMH Local
John Glenn Columbus International Airport (official site)
Real-Time Flight Information for John Glenn Columbus International Airport

Buildings and structures in Columbus, Ohio
Transportation in Columbus, Ohio
Airports in Ohio
Airports established in 1929
Columbus International Airport
Transportation buildings and structures in Franklin County, Ohio
1929 establishments in Ohio